Iassen Ghiuselev (born  1964) is a Bulgarian illustrator of many classic stories including Pinocchio, Alice in Wonderland and The King of the Golden River.

Ghiuselev was born in Sofia, Bulgaria, in 1964. His father is the Bulgarian opera singer Nicola Ghiuselev. Iassen Ghiuselev attended the School of Art in Sofia and then studied at the National Academy of Arts. He graduated in 1990 and started work as a freelance illustrator.

Ghuiselev creates cover pictures, graphics and other illustrations for some of the best-known publishers and magazines in Sofia. He also works with the magazines Vanity Fair and Vogue in Italy.

Awards
Die Zeit and Radio Bremen awarded him the LUCHS 93 prize for his illustrations in The Queen Bee, published by Esslinger.  The American Institute of Graphic Arts designated Pinocchio as one of the Fifty Best Books of 2001 in its annual juried contest.  Pinocchio also won the 2002 Independent Publisher award for juvenile fiction, and was the recipient of the Alcuin Society Book Design honorable mention in 2001.  Alice's Adventures in Wonderland took 3rd Prize at the 22nd Annual Awards for Excellence in Book Design in Canada (2003) from The Alcuin Society.

Bibliography
 Lewis Carroll's Alice 2007 Calendar (2006) 
 Da Vinci Tarot Kit (2006) 
 The King of the Golden River (2005) 
 Pendulum Power Magic/Pendulo poder y magia (2005)  
 Alice's Adventures in Wonderland (2003) 
 The Queen Bee (2003) 
 Las aventuras de Pinocho (2003) 
 Pinocchio: The Story of A Puppet (2002) 
 Michelangelo: Renaissance Artist (Great Names) (2002) 
 Socrates: Greek Philosopher (Great Names) (2002) 
 Tarot of the III Millennium (2001) 
 Orpheus and Eurydice (2001) 
 Orpheus und Euridike (1997) 
 Arthur and Excalibur: The Legend of King Arthur and the Great Magic Sword (1995)

References

1964 births
Living people
Bulgarian illustrators
Bulgarian children's book illustrators
Artists from Sofia